Ermenberga (fl. 6th/7th centuries CE) was a Visigoth princess, a daughter of Witteric.

In 606 she married Theuderic II, the Frankish king of Burgundy.

She was later repudiated by Theuderic, her eventual fate is uncertain.

References

Visigothic women
Burgundian queens consort
6th-century women
7th-century Frankish women